Ellsworth Tenney "Babe" Dahlgren (June 15, 1912 – September 4, 1996) was an American professional baseball infielder. He played twelve seasons in Major League Baseball from 1935 to 1946 for the Boston Red Sox, New York Yankees, Boston Braves, Chicago Cubs, St. Louis Browns, Brooklyn Dodgers, Philadelphia Phillies, and Pittsburgh Pirates. Dahlgren is perhaps best remembered for replacing Lou Gehrig in the lineup on May 2, 1939, which ended Gehrig's 14-year, 2,130 consecutive game streak. Dahlgren hit a home run and a double as the Yankees routed Detroit 22–2. He went on to hit 15 home runs and drive in 89 runs for the season for the Yankees.

The Browns returned Dahlgren to the Cubs for a contract dispute once it was learned that he had become eligible for the draft in May 1942. He was sold to the Dodgers soon after. In August 1942 he sought voluntary retirement. In early 1943, Dahlgren was notified by the draft board to report for his physical, which occurred in mid-May of that year. After passing his physical, Dahlgren was to be inducted into the military in July 1943. In July 1943, he played on the National League All-star team. In October 1943, Dahlgren was rejected for military service due to a sinus condition.

Highlights
 Had a 621 consecutive game streak with the San Francisco Missions of the Pacific Coast League from 1931 to 1934
 Member of the 1934 Pacific Coast League All-Star Team as a First Baseman for the Mission Reds
 Member of the 1936 International League All-Star Team as a First Baseman for the Syracuse Chiefs
 Member of the 1937 International League All-Star Team as a Third Baseman for Newark Bears
 Member of 1938-39 New York Yankees World Series Champions
 Hit the first home run of the 1939 World Series in game 2 off of Bucky Walters
 Named to 1943 National League All-Star Team as an Infielder for the Philadelphia Phillies
 Presided over the first American League pension plan meeting in 1946

References

External links

1912 births
1996 deaths
National League All-Stars
Boston Braves players
Boston Red Sox players
Brooklyn Dodgers players
Chicago Cubs players
New York Yankees players
Philadelphia Phillies players
Pittsburgh Pirates players
St. Louis Browns players
Major League Baseball first basemen
Baseball players from San Francisco
Mission Reds players
Tucson Missions players
Syracuse Chiefs players
Newark Bears (IL) players
Sacramento Solons players
Baltimore Orioles (IL) players
Burials at Forest Lawn Memorial Park (Glendale)